Simon Linscheid (born 12 June 1967) is an Irish bobsledder. He competed in the two man and the four man events at the 1998 Winter Olympics. Linscheid later became the owner of a greetings card company in Dublin.

References

External links
 

1967 births
Living people
Irish male bobsledders
Olympic bobsledders of Ireland
Bobsledders at the 1998 Winter Olympics
Place of birth missing (living people)